Campiglossa plantaginis is a species of fruit fly in the family Tephritidae.

Distribution
The species is found in coasts of North, the Baltic Sea, the Atlantic Ocean, saline areas of Central, East to Ukraine.

References

Tephritinae
Insects described in 1833
Diptera of Europe